The Dubai Kahayla Classic is a Group 1 race for Purebred Arabians held on Dubai World Cup Night at Meydan Racecourse in Dubai. It carries a purse of US$1,000,000 and is held annually on the last Saturday in March.

The Dubai Kahayla Classic started life as the Mashreq Bank Handicap in 1996 before becoming the Dubai Arabian Classic conditions race in 1997. In 2000 the race became the Dubai Kahayla Classic. It became a Group 1 race in 1999 and was run on dirt at Nad Al Sheba Racecourse until 2010, when the first renewal of the race was run at the newly built Meydan Racecourse on the synthetic Tapeta surface.

Due to the COVID-19 Pandemic, the 2020 Kahayla Classic was canceled.

Winners

Records

Speed record:
 Mile and a Quarter: 2:11.87 – Deryan (2021)

Most wins by a horse:
 3 – Alanudd (US) Unchained Melody (1997, 1998, 1999)
 3 – Madjani (FR) (2005, 2006, 2007)

Most wins by a jockey:
 4 – Richard Hills (2003, 2004, 2006, 2007)

Most wins by a trainer:
 4 – Gillian Duffield (2004, 2005, 2006, 2007)

Most wins by an owner:
 8 – HH Shk Hamdan Bin Rashid Al Maktoum (2000, 2003, 2004, 2005, 2006, 2007, 2015, 2016)

References

Horse races in the United Arab Emirates
1996 establishments in the United Arab Emirates
Recurring sporting events established in 1996